Let Sleeping Dogs Lie may refer to:

Music
 Let Sleeping Dogs Lie, a 2015 album by Junkyard Choir
 Let Sleeping Dogs Lie, a 1983 album by Julia Downes
 Let Sleeping Dogs Lie, a 2008 album by Ricardo Garcia
 "Let Sleeping Dogs Lie", a song by Sheena Easton from the 1983 album Best Kept Secret
 "Let Sleeping Dogs Lie", a song by Michael Schenker Group from the 1982 album One Night at Budokan
 "Let Sleeping Dogs Lie", a song by Yngwie Malmsteen from the 2012 album Spellbound
 "Let Sleeping Dogs Lie", a song by Cassandra Vasik from the 1993 album Feels like Home
 "Let Sleeping Dogs Lie", a song by Pop Shuvit from the 2006 album Amped & Dangerous

Television
 "Let Sleeping Dogs Lie", a 2021 episode of Selling Sunset
 "Let Sleeping Dogs Lie", a 1968 episode of Beggar My Neighbour
 "Let Sleeping Dogs Lie", a 2001 episode of Men, Women & Dogs
 "Let Sleeping Dogs Lie", a 2017 episode of The Ancient Magus' Bride
 "Let Sleeping Dogs Lie", a 2008 episode of Just Jordan
 "Let Sleeping Dogs Lie", a 2007 episode of Dogstar
 "Let Sleeping Dogs Lie", a 1967 episode of The Informer
 "Let Sleeping Dogs Lie", a 1974 episode of The Liver Birds

Literature
 Let Sleeping Dogs Lie, a 2014 novel by Rita Mae Brown
 "Let Sleeping Dogs Lie", a 2005 comic story in Beasts of Burden
 Let Sleeping Dogs Lie, a 1986 book in the Hank the Cowdog series

See also
 List of proverbial phrases
 Sleeping Dogs (disambiguation)
 Let Sleeping Dogs..., a 2005 album by The Dogs D'Amour
 Where Sleeping Dogs Lie, a 1991 American neo noir thriller film
 Henry IV, Part 2 by Shakespeare: "Wake not a sleeping wolf"
 Troilus and Criseyde by Chaucer: "It is not good a sleping hound to wake"